Kawartha Pine Ridge District School Board (known as English-language Public District School Board No. 14 prior to 1999) is a public, secular, English language school board headquartered in Peterborough, Ontario.  It is the amalgamation of the former Peterborough County Board of Education and the Northumberland-Clarington Board of Education and serves the communities located in the Kawarthas to the north, and south to Lake Ontario. Hastings County is its eastern border and its western border extends to the City of Kawartha Lakes and to the edge of the City of Oshawa.

The Kawartha Pine Ridge District School Board has 73 elementary schools, 13 secondary schools and three adult learning centres to serve its urban and rural communities.

Schools

Elementary

Apsley Central Public School, Apsley
Armour Heights Public School, Peterborough
Baltimore Public School, Baltimore
Beatrice Strong Public School, Port Hope
Brighton Public School, Brighton
Buckhorn Public School, Buckhorn
Burnham Public School, Cobourg
Camborne Public School, Cobourg
Central Public School, Bowmanville
Charles Bowman Public School, Bowmanville, Ontario
Chemong Public School, Bridgenorth
Colborne Public School, Colborne
Courtice North Public School, Courtice
CR Gummow Public School, Cobourg
Dr Emily Stowe Public School, Courtice
Dr GJ MacGillivray Public School, Courtice
Dr Ross Tilley Public School, Bowmanville
Duke of Cambridge Public School Bowmanville
Edmison Heights Public School, Peterborough
Enniskillen Public School, Enniskillen
Ganaraska Trail Public School, Port Hope
Grafton Public School, Grafton
Grant Sine Public School, Cobourg
Hampton Junior Public School, Hampton
Harold Longworth Public School, Bowmanville
Hastings Public School, Hastings
Havelock-Belmont Public School, Havelock
Highland Heights Public School, Peterborough
Hillcrest Public School, Campbellford
James Strath Public School, Peterborough
John M James Public School, Bowmanville
Kawartha Heights Public School, Peterborough
Keith Wightman Public School, Peterborough
Kent Public School, Campbellford
King George Public School, Peterborough
Lakefield Intermediate Public School, Lakefield
Lydia Trull Public School, Courtice
MJ Hobbs Senior Public School, Hampton
Merwin Greer Public School, Cobourg
Millbrook/South Cavan Public School, Millbrook
Murray Centennial Public School, Trenton
Newcastle Public School, Newcastle
North Cavan Public School, Cavan
North Hope Central Public School, Campbellcroft
North Shore Public School, Keene
Northumberland Hills Public School, Castleton
Norwood District Public School, Norwood
Orono Public School, Orono
Otonabee Valley Public School, Peterborough
Percy Centennial Public School, Warkworth
Plainville Public School, Gore's Landing
Prince of Wales Public School, Peterborough
Queen Elizabeth Public School, Peterborough
Queen Mary Public School, Peterborough
R F Downey Public School, Peterborough
Ridpath Junior Public School, Lakefield
Roger Neilson Public School, Peterborough
Roseneath Public School, Roseneath
S.T. Worden Public School, Courtice
Smithfield Public School, Brighton
South Cramahe Public School, Colborne
Spring Valley Public School, Brighton
Stockdale Public School, Frankford
Terry Fox Public School, Cobourg
Vincent Massey Public School, Bowmanville
Warsaw Public School, Warsaw
Waverley Public School, Bowmanville
Westmount Public School, Peterborough

Intermediate

Adam Scott Intermediate, Peterborough
Clarington Central Intermediate, Bowmanville
Courtice Intermediate School, Courtice
Dale Road Intermediate School, Cobourg
Dr MS Hawkins Intermediate School, Port Hope
Kenner Intermediate Public School, Peterborough
Norwood District Intermediate Public School, Norwood
The Pines Intermediate School, Newcastle

Secondary

Adam Scott Collegiate and Vocational Institute, Peterborough
Bowmanville High School, Bowmanville
Campbellford District High School, Campbellford
Clarington Central Secondary School, Bowmanville
Clarke High School, Newcastle
Cobourg Collegiate Institute, Cobourg
Courtice Secondary School, Courtice
Crestwood Secondary School, Peterborough
East Northumberland Secondary School, Brighton
Kenner Collegiate Vocational Institute, Peterborough
Norwood District High School, Norwood
Port Hope High School, Port Hope
Thomas A. Stewart Secondary School, Peterborough

Trustees

On April 26, 2018, Aidan Hussey and Lindsay Keene were appointed student trustees for 2018-2019.

On December 6, 2018, Diane Lloyd was elected Chairperson of the Board and Sarah Bobka was elected Vice-Chairperson of the Board for 2018-2019.

References

External links
 Kawartha Pine Ridge District School Board website
 Kawartha Pine Ridge School Board Facebook page

See also
Peterborough Victoria Northumberland and Clarington Catholic District School Board
List of school districts in Ontario
List of high schools in Ontario

School districts in Ontario
Educational institutions in Canada with year of establishment missing